Semagystia stchetkini is a moth in the family Cossidae. It was described by Yakovlev in 2007. It is found in Tajikistan and Uzbekistan.

The length of the forewings is 11–15 mm. The forewings are dark-grey with suffusions of yellow scales and transversal dark bands. The hindwings are dark grey with a narrow light brown border.

References

Natural History Museum Lepidoptera generic names catalog

Cossinae
Moths described in 2007